Oldwood is a hamlet in the English county of Worcestershire.

Oldwood is located on the A4112 road a mile southwest of the market town of Tenbury Wells.

External links 

Hamlets in Worcestershire
Tenbury Wells